Kwon Hyeok-soo is a Korean name consisting of the family name Kwon and the given name Hyeok-soo, and may also refer to:

 Kwon Hyeok-soo (voice actor) (born 1954), South Korean voice actor
 Kwon Hyuk-soo (actor) (born 1986), South Korean actor